Alcyon was a French professional cycling team that was active from 1905 to 1959, and returned in 1961 and 1962. It was started by Alcyon, a French bicycle, automobile and motorcycle manufacturer.

History 

The team won the Tour de France four times before World War I with François Faber in 1909, Octave Lapize in 1910, Gustave Garrigou in 1911 and Odile Defraye in 1912. Alcyon won the team prize at the Tour de France from 1909 to 1912 and then from 1927 to 1929.

Immediately after the First World War, Alcyon like many other bicycle companies joined a Consortium that employed many riders under the La Sportive name. This consortium would win the Tour de France from 1919 to 1921. The Consortium stopped in 1922 and the member companies which included Automoto, Peugeot and Alcyon restarted up their separate cycling teams. Alcyon grew into a very strong team that dominated the Tour de France with three wins in with Nicolas Frantz in 1927 and in 1928 and Maurice De Waele  in 1929.

Alcyon dominated the Tour de France during the 1920s. In the 1929 edition, Maurice Dewaele won the race despite the fact that he was sick when the race went through the Alps. This was because no one attacked the Alcyon rider there. The organisers of the Tour de France decided in 1930 that the race would be disputed by national teams. It has been said that this was done to break the domination of some of the commercial teams, most notably Alcyon  As a result, Alcyon was unable to continue to dominate the race. However Alycon-Dunlop riders riding for the French national team were able to dominate the race, such as André Leducq, an Alycon-Dunlop rider who won the very first Tour that was disputed by national teams. Leducq would win the Tour again in 1932, while another Alycon rider, Georges Speicher won the Tour again in 1933. Belgians Romain Maes and Sylvère Maes were riders of the team when they won the Tour de France in 1935, 1936 and 1939.

After World War II, the team name changed to Alcyon-BP (1946–1949), which was followed by Alcyon-Dunlop (1950–1954). Alcyon stopped sponsoring the team after 1958, although a team existed for 1961 and 1962, managed by former rider Georges Speicher.

Major wins
 Bordeaux–Paris 1906, 1907, 1909, 1911, 1913, 1914, 1923, 1926, 1939, 1946
 Belgian National Cyclo Cross Championship 1953
 French National Cyclo-Cross Championship 1909, 1910, 1911, 1912,
 Luxembourgish National Cyclo Cross Championship 1924, 1940
 Flèche Wallonne 1947
 Giro di Lombardia 1913
 Gent–Wevelgem 1946, 1947, 1950, 1955
 Grand Prix des Nations 1941, 1942
 Kuurne–Brussels–Kuurne 1949, 1955
 Liège–Bastogne–Liège 1921, 1922, 1923, 1924, 1936, 1937, 1945, 1953
 Milan–San Remo 1908, 1910, 1911, 1912, 1913, 1955
 Omloop Het Volk 1945, 1946
 Paris–Brussels 1909, 1914, 1922, 1923, 1924, 1927, 1931, 1936, 1937, 1946, 1947
 Paris–Nice 1934
 Paris–Roubaix 1908, 1910, 1925, 1930, 1931, 1933, 1935, 1937, 1939, 1944, 1945, 1953
 Paris–Tours 1909, 1910, 1912, 1924, 1929, 1934, 1935, 1936, 1938, 1941, 1942, 1945, 1946, 1947
 Belgian National Road Race Championships 1908, 1909, 1919, 1922, 1926, 1934, 1935, 1936, 1937, 1942, 1946, 1947
 French National Road Race Championships 1909, 1936, 1937, 1938, 1942, 1943, 1944
 Luxembourgish National Road Race Championships 1924, 1925, 1927, 1928, 1929, 1930, 1931, 1932, 1933, 1937, 1938
 German National Road Race Championships 1937
 Tour of Flanders 1914, 1934, 1939, 1948
 Scheldeprijs Vlaanderen 1924, 1934, 1952, 1955
 Tour de France General classification 1909, 1910, 1911, 1912, 1927, 1928, 1929
 Vuelta a España General classification 1947
 World Road Race Championship 1933, 1935, 1937, 1948

References

External links
 History, catalogs, technic...

External links

Defunct cycling teams based in France
Cycling teams established in 1905
Cycling teams disestablished in 1962
Cycling teams based in France
1905 establishments in France